Ohlone/Chynoweth station is a light rail station on the Santa Clara Valley Transportation Authority (VTA) light rail system. The station is served by the system's Blue Line.

Until the end of 2019, it served as the terminus of the little-used, stub Ohlone/Chynoweth–Almaden line, popularly known as the Almaden Shuttle. It was part of the original Guadalupe Line, the first segment of light rail from Santa Teresa to Tasman. The shuttle was replaced by the  bus line.

Location 

Ohlone/Chynoweth station is located near the intersection of State Route 87 and State Route 85 in southern San Jose, California. Nearby Gunderson High School is served by this station. Ohlone/Chynoweth is very close to the Westfield Oakridge shopping mall.

References

External links 

Santa Clara Valley Transportation Authority light rail stations
Santa Clara Valley Transportation Authority bus stations
Railway stations in San Jose, California
Railway stations in the United States opened in 1987
1987 establishments in California